"Forever Now" is a song by Canadian singer Michael Bublé. It was released on 1 March 2019 and is from Bublé's eighth studio album, Love. The song reached no.19 on US adult contemporary charts.

Background
Bublé, inspired by how much he loves being a dad, wrote the song for his children. He said: "It's too much fun, I laugh all the time, it's the best thing that ever happened". "I've never written a more succinct song talking about what many of us feel we're brought to this earth to do. It was about time and sentimentality".

Music video
The music video was released on 1 March 2019. The video shows a room in which a child can be seen growing from a newborn to an adult.

Charts

Weekly charts

Year-end charts

References

2018 songs
2019 singles
Michael Bublé songs
Songs written by Michael Bublé
Songs written by Alan Chang